Rascal Does Not Dream of Bunny Girl Senpai, known in Japan as , is a Japanese light novel series written by Hajime Kamoshida and illustrated by Kēji Mizoguchi. ASCII Media Works have published twelve volumes since April 2014 under their Dengeki Bunko imprint.

A manga adaptation with art by Tsugumi Nanamiya has been serialized in ASCII Media Works' seinen manga magazine Dengeki G's Comic since December 2015. An anime television series adaptation of the first five volumes by CloverWorks aired from October to December 2018. An anime film adapting volumes six and seven, titled Rascal Does Not Dream of a Dreaming Girl, premiered in June 2019. Rascal Does Not Dream of a Sister Venturing Out, a second film adapting volumes eight and nine, is set to premiere in Q3 2023.

Premise
High school student Sakuta Azusagawa's life takes a turn for the unexpected when he meets teenage actress Mai Sakurajima, dressed as a bunny girl, wandering through a library and not being noticed by anyone else there. Mai is intrigued that Sakuta is the only one who can see her, as other people are unable to see her, even when she is dressing normally or attempting to stay away from celebrity life. Calling this phenomenon "Adolescence Syndrome", Sakuta decides to solve this mystery, while continuing to get closer to Mai and meeting other girls who suffer from "Adolescence Syndrome" as well.

Characters

Main

Harboring a bad reputation after allegedly hospitalizing three people, Sakuta attempts to keep a low profile until his meeting with Mai prompts him to investigate Adolescence Syndrome. His sister Kaede's Adolescence Syndrome affected him as well, leading to him suffering three cuts to his chest. Sakuta's life changes when he meets Mai and helps her overcoming her Adolescence Syndrome, which leads him into getting involved with other girls that suffer the same condition.
 Sakuta is a nice and helpful person, but he is also very snarky. When speaking to others he is incredibly blunt, honest, and straightforward, as well as being prone to lewd jokes. Sakuta is selfless and caring, often willing to sacrifice his time or even his own well-being to help others. His selflessness stems from the Adolescence Syndrome that involved his sister Kaede as well as from his desire to become a kinder person after first meeting Shoko Makinohara.

Tired from the pressures of her acting work, Mai decides to take a hiatus but suddenly realizes people are unable to acknowledge her existence, except Sakuta, who agrees to help figure out what's happening, all while she continues to get closer to him. She first meets Sakuta at a library, while she was wearing a bunny girl outfit to test if people would notice her. As time passes, more people start forgetting about Mai's existence until Sakuta himself is left to remember. Sakuta is able to restore Mai's existence and everyone's memories of her when he declares his love to Mai in front of the entire school. After that, Sakuta and Mai attempt to start a relationship, which is made difficult given Mai's acting work. Later, Mai is infected by her half-sister Nodoka's Adolescence Syndrome, causing both girls to exchange physical appearances. It is only when Sakuta helps both sisters reconcile that they return to normal. Mai is the focal character of the first light novel.
Personality wise, Mai is levelheaded, polite and very kind: she is helpful, denounces Sakuta's bad reputation as false and also has a very soft spot for Kaede. While she can be snarky, she is pure-hearted, and sometimes even shy around Sakuta's lewd jokes. Like Sakuta, she is also very selfless.

The focal character of the second light novel, Tomoe is a first year student at Sakuta's high school. She initially meets Sakuta at a park while he was trying to help a young girl look for her mother, which leads Tomoe to accuse Sakuta of being a lolicon. She is very self conscious and asks Sakuta to be her pretend boyfriend so her friends wouldn't say anything bad about her behind her back. However, crazy accusations start up about her and she eventually falls in love with him after seeing him defend her. Unfortunately, Tomoe's feelings for Sakuta cause the last day of their relationship to repeat itself. Sakuta confronts Tomoe about her feelings, which she confesses but ultimately he turns her down. Even so, they agree to be friends.

The focal character of the third light novel, Rio is the sole member of the science club at Sakuta and Mai's high school and one of Sakuta's only friends. She initially believed Adolescence Syndrome is a myth until she suffers it herself. Due to lacking confidence in her appearance, a clone of hers appears with a different personality and who posts suggestive pictures of herself online to punish herself. The two Rios merge into one person again when Sakuta helps them both accept themselves and the friendships they have made.

The focal character of the fourth light novel, Nodoka is Mai's half-sister and a member of an idol group. She swapped bodies with Mai due to her inferiority complex, but swapped back after realizing that she did not have to be exactly like Mai. The half-sisters only return to normal after reconciling.

 Sakuta's younger sister and another victim of Adolescence Syndrome, Kaede mysteriously began to suffer injuries after suffering online bullying and getting death threats on her cellphone that left her with a phobia of strangers. She only made a recovery after she stopped using social media or going to school. After that, she stays at Sakuta's apartment, with only her cat to keep her company. She is extremely fond of her brother and frequently climbs into bed with him while he is sleeping. It is later discovered that Kaede is suffering from dissociative disorder. She had forgotten who she was and became a completely different Kaede. She eventually regains her memories but forgets the events of the previous two years. Although Sakuta is saddened that the sister he has come to know has ceased to exist, he nevertheless accepts the return of his original sister and decides to help her regain her old life. Kaede is the focal character of the fifth light novel.

The focal character of the sixth and seventh light novels, Shoko has the same name as Sakuta's first crush. She is a shy middle school student who bumps into Sakuta during a rain storm. It is later revealed that she is the Shoko that Sakuta met during his episode, but had moved away to recover from a heart transplant. After Kaede regains her memories, Shoko appears to Sakuta again and helps him move past his grief after losing the Kaede he had come to know over the past 2 years. When Sakuta calms down, Shoko departs, but later returns and declares that she will be living in Sakuta's house for a period of time, much to the dismay of Mai. It is later revealed that there are 2 versions of Shoko in their timeline, and that the older version only exists because Sakuta will die in a car accident on Christmas day, resulting in his heart being donated to Shoko, allowing her to continue living, hence the reason behind Sakuta's scars. When Mai sacrifices herself to save Sakuta from the accident, Shoko helps Sakuta travel back in time to fix his mistake and save Mai. She also travels back to her elementary school timeline to mend the problem causing her Adolescence Syndrome, creating an alternate timeline where Sakuta and Mai never meet Shoko. They later reconcile when Sakuta sees Shoko by the beach and remembers all the memories the two of them shared from the previous timeline.

Supporting

Sakuta's best friend. He is dating Saki Kamisato but they often argue over Saki's relationship with Sakuta. He also worked in the same family restaurant as Sakuta.

Saki is Yūma's girlfriend. She hates Sakuta and wishes he would stop being Yuma's friend as his status as the class loner is making Yuma, and more importantly, herself less popular as well.

Fumika is a reporter who is interested in Adolescence Syndrome and believes the scars on Sakuta's chest were somehow caused by it.

Media

Light novels
Rascal Does Not Dream of Bunny Girl Senpai is written by Hajime Kamoshida and features illustrations by Keeji Mizoguchi. ASCII Media Works have published twelve volumes since April 2014 under their Dengeki Bunko imprint. Yen Press has been publishing the English version of the light novel since April 28, 2020.

Manga
A manga adaptation drawn by Tsugumi Nanamiya began serialization in the January 2016 issue of ASCII Media Works' Dengeki G's Comic magazine, which was released on December 1, 2015. Yen Press has been publishing the English version of the manga in a 2-in-1 omnibus edition since August 18, 2020.

Anime
A 13-episode anime television series adaptation, titled Rascal Does Not Dream of Bunny Girl Senpai, aired from October 4 to December 27, 2018, on ABC and other channels. The series was animated by CloverWorks and directed by Sōichi Masui, with Kazuya Iwata as assistant director, Masahiro Yokotani handling series composition, and Satomi Tamura designing the characters. The band Fox Capture Plan composed the series' music. Satomi Tamura also served as the chief animation director along with Akira Takata. The anime series adapts the series' first through fifth volumes. Aniplex of America has licensed the series and it is streamed on Crunchyroll, Hulu,  FunimationNow, and Netflix. Aniplex of America released a complete Blu-ray set on November 19, 2019, with English subtitles. In Australia and New Zealand, the series was simulcast on AnimeLab, and in Southeast Asia on Aniplus Asia. MVM Entertainment acquired the series for distribution in the UK and Ireland.

An anime film adaptation, titled , premiered on June 15, 2019. The film adapts the series' sixth and seventh volumes. The staff and cast reprised their roles from the anime.

During the Aniplex Online Fest event in September 2022, it was announced that a sequel adapting the eighth and ninth light novel volumes has been greenlit. The main staff and cast are returning from the previous adaptation. The sequel will be released theatrically in Japan in Q3 2023.

Notes

References

External links
 
 
 

2014 Japanese novels
Anime and manga based on light novels
Aniplex franchises
Asahi Broadcasting Corporation original programming
ASCII Media Works manga
CloverWorks
Crunchyroll Anime Awards winners
Dengeki Bunko
Kadokawa Dwango franchises
Light novels
Psychological anime and manga
Seinen manga
Supernatural anime and manga
Tokyo MX original programming
Yen Press titles